Spialia sertorius, the red-underwing skipper, is a butterfly of the family Hesperiidae.

Description

The red-underwing skipper can be confused with the species of the genus Pyrgus. The underside has a cinnamon-red to yellowish base tone, while in Pyrgus species it is mostly greenish to brownish in color. Since this coloring is less clear in older butterflies (and deviations occur), the characteristic arrangement of the spots on the underside of the hind wing should always be used for the determination. Furthermore, on the upper side of the forewing, a series of small, distinctly bright spots in the submarginal bandage is characteristic, which runs in a regular flat curve to the front edge. The four spots of the post-discal region further towards the wing base are also in a row, while in the species of the genus Pyrgus, only three are side by side and the fourth is disengaged. The wingspan is 22-26 mm. 

The identification situation in Spain is difficult, as the Spialia rosae described from there in 2016 flies together with Spialia sertorius at altitudes around 1000 m, and the two species  can be distinguished, either on the basis of external nor on the basis of genital features. Definite differences can only be found in the genetics (barcoding), and in the food of the caterpillars. Butterflies from the lower altitudes of Spain should belong to Spialia sertorius, those well above 1200 m to Spialia rosae - but without observation of oviposition or genetic testing, the identification ultimately remains uncertain.

Range
Spialia sertorius is widespread within Western and Central Europe. To the south, the area extends over southern Europe to North Africa. It extends eastward to western Poland, the Czech Republic, Slovenia and Croatia. The species, however, is absent in Scandinavia and Great Britain, and is extinct in the Netherlands. In Germany, Spialia sertorius is absent in the north-eastern federal states. The species is widespread in southern and southwestern Europe and central Europe. In Eastern Austria and in Eastern Europe, it is being replaced by Spialia orbifer.

Habitat
Due to the location requirements of Sanguisorba minor, there is a close connection to poor grasslands on limestone or calcareous conglomerates. Even if the host plants have their main occurrence in completely dry grasslands or in the gaps in pioneer stages of semi-dry grasslands, there is a strong preference for plants in small locations with particularly favorable thermal conditions. 

In Central Europe Spialia sertorius occurs from the lower altitudes to altitudes above 1000 m, with the reports showing a clear maximum at 400-500 m, which, compared to most reports, is disproportionately high. Above 1000 m, the thermal requirements of the species are only met at locations that are particularly favorable in terms of microclimate, such as south-facing slopes. The altitudinal limit of the host plant in the Bavarian Alps is usually only a little over 1200 m. From the warm years after the Second World War, however, there are documents with altitudes around 1700m and 1700-2000 m. It is likely that the butterflies had drifted.

Ecology
The butterfly flies from April to September depending on the location. There are usually two generations per year, adults of the second generation being smaller than those of the first. Spialia sertorius can develop two generations in all major areas of Central Europe. The significantly lower number of reports from the second generation here suggests that they appear less frequently and not in all years. A second generation with fewer individuals is also known from the Palatinate, for example, and is attributed to the fact that a significant part of the offspring of the spring generation no longer develops in the same year, but only pupates after the hibernation in April. Due to weather-related annual flight period fluctuations, the large altitude range of the reports and the second generation, which does not occur annually, the phenology does not show any clear two-peaks. The earliest Bavarian reports come from the second half of April in the extremely warm spring of 2007. From the turn of the month to May, however, the first observations are already available from several other years.

The main flight period of the first generation usually begins in mid-May and reaches its maximum at the end of May, with reports then falling sharply by the end of July. From around the middle of August there are signs of a renewed accumulation of reports that can be traced back to the appearance of the second generation. The reports drag on into September, at the beginning of September even fresh butterflies were observed on the Munich plain. In the Alpine region, the reports only range from mid-May to mid-August. The data indicates that the formation of a second generation does not occur everywhere or on a regular basis. However, few reports from heights over 1000 m are still available after mid-July. This indicates that in favorable years, imagos of a subsequent generation occasionally appear even at such altitudes. 

The Red-underwing Skipper only uses Sanguisorba minor as an egg-laying and caterpillar forage plant. The eggs of the first generation are mainly laid on the flower heads that are still closed, but occasionally also on the leaves. Since Sanguisorba minor only blooms again regularly after the summer drought in completely dry grassland, the second-generation females in many places only have leaves available as an egg-laying medium. This is why they mainly glue their eggs to the upper side (more rarely the underside) of leaflets of the pinnate leaves of the host plants. Leaves lying on the ground are preferred. 

Young caterpillars hatched in flower heads feed on ripening seeds and flower parts during the first two stages; those from eggs laid on leaves initially mine in these. Later the caterpillars live in leaf bags made of leaflets from the host plant. The caterpillars of single-breeding populations usually overwinter in the last caterpillar stadium, those of a second generation as young caterpillars. According to field observations in Switzerland, the caterpillars spend the winter in a partial leaf of the Sanguisorba minor that is spun together as a housing. Pupation should take place on the ground in a web of leaf pieces.

The imagos are characterized by a very rapid flight close to the ground. The males are easiest to spot because they behave territorially and regularly visit places like the flower heads of Sanguisorba minor. The imagos are not seen too often when visiting flowers. There are multiple reports of sucking observations on Hippocrepis comosa and Lotus corniculatus from Bavaria. These plants are also mentioned as important nectar plants for Baden-Württemberg and the Palatinate. Furthermore, the species was observed on Thymus spp. in Bavaria. As well as on Globularia cordifolia, Teucrium montanum, Geranium sanguineum and Pimpinella spp. The males in particular like to suckle on moist soil.

Conservation 
The species depends on the preservation of poorly overgrown grasslands with a favorable microclimate. Even rock areas on dry slopes are no longer used as a reproductive habitat after abandonment of use due to the shading by the neighboring trees. The majority of the occurrences are therefore dependent on grazing, the intensity of which must also be sufficient to create localized ground wounds. Low grazing intensity is therefore only sufficient for sheep grazing in locations with very shallow soil. Intensive sheep or goat grazing can preserve habitats. Grazing habitats between May and the end of July is problematic because of the loss of the flower heads. In the case of cattle grazing, a small amount of grazing is sufficient for the creation of open ground areas, especially on slopes. Intensive grazing should be avoided in any case, as eutrophication through the faeces must be avoided at the same time.

Mowing is unsuitable for maintaining the necessary habitat structures in most locations, as it encourages the development of closed, grass-dominated vegetation. It is therefore only sufficient on shallow rocky surfaces to maintain the habitat structure. Numerous habitats, such as urban wastelands or railway embankments, can hardly be preserved in the long term through biotope maintenance alone due to their less extreme site conditions. In this case, it is essential to ensure site dynamics by deliberately relocating the succession by removing the topsoil or alternatively creating nutrient-poor gravel sites in a close spatial network.

Taxonomy

Synonyms

Papilio sao Huebner, 1803

Spialia hibiscae Hemming, 1936

Subspecies:
Spialia sertorius sertorius (Europe)
Spialia sertorius ali (Oberthür, 1881) (Morocco, Algeria, Tunisia)

References
Whalley, Paul - Mitchell Beazley Guide to Butterflies (1981, reprinted 1992)

External links

Lepiforum.de

Spialia
Butterflies described in 1804
Butterflies of Europe
Taxa named by Johann Centurius Hoffmannsegg